Halvor Bernt Stein Grieg Halvorsen (19 October 1909 – 11 November 2013) was a Norwegian theatre actor.

He was born in Kristiania, the son of composer Johan Halvorsen (1864–1935) and Annie Grieg (1873–1957). He was married to Odd Frogg's widow Elizabeth Inga Else Margrethe Thaulow (1903–1968) from 1940, then after her death to Vibeke Laura Mowinckel Falk from 1971. Stein Grieg Halvorsen was employed at Nationaltheatret from 1928 to 1935, Den Nationale Scene from 1935 to 1936, and again Nationaltheatret from 1936 to 1939 and from 1945 to his retirement in 1997.

His son, Stein Johan Grieg Halvorsen, is half of the comedy duo Erlend & SteinJo, who rose to fame in the 1990s.

Halvorsen died of natural causes on 11 November 2013, three weeks after his 104th birthday.

See also
 List of centenarians (actors, filmmakers and entertainers)

References

External links

1909 births
2013 deaths
Male actors from Oslo
Norwegian centenarians
Norwegian male stage actors
Men centenarians